{{Infobox organisation
| name = International Cricket Council
| image = International Cricket Council (logo).svg
| caption = Current ICC Members - Red represents Full members
| abbreviation = ICC
| motto = Cricket for good.
| predecessor = Imperial Cricket Conference (1909–1965) 
International Cricket Conference (1965–1989)
| formation = 
| headquarters =  Dubai, United Arab Emirates (2005–present) 
  London, England (1909–2005)
| languages = English
| revenue = US$40.7 million  (2020) 
| type = Federation of national associations
| membership = 108* members
| leader_title = Chairman
| leader_name =  Greg Barclay
| leader_title2 = CEO
| leader_name2 =  Geoff Allardice
| leader_title3 = General Manager
| leader_name3 =  Wasim Khan
| website = ICC-Cricket.com
}}

The International Cricket Council (ICC) is the global governing body of cricket. It was founded as the Imperial Cricket Conference in 1909 by representatives from Australia, England and South Africa. It was renamed as the International Cricket Conference in 1965, and took up its current name in 1987. The ICC has its headquarters in Dubai, United Arab Emirates.

The ICC has 108 member nations currently: 12 Full Members that play Test matches, and 96 Associate Members. The ICC is responsible for the organisation and governance of cricket's major international tournaments, most notably the Cricket World Cup and the T20 World Cup. It also appoints the umpires and referees that officiate at all sanctioned Test matches, One Day Internationals and Twenty20 Internationals. It promulgates the ICC Code of Conduct, which sets professional standards of discipline for international cricket, and also co-ordinates action against corruption and match-fixing through its Anti-Corruption and Security Unit (ACSU).

The ICC does not control bilateral fixtures between member countries (which include all Test matches), and neither does it govern domestic cricket within member countries. It does not make or alter the laws of the game, which have remained under the governance of the Marylebone Cricket Club since 1788.

The Chairman heads the board of directors and on 26 June 2014, Narayanaswami Srinivasan, the former president of BCCI, was announced as the first chairman of the council. The role of ICC president has become a largely honorary position since the establishment of the chairman role and other changes were made to the ICC constitution in 2014. It has been claimed that the 2014 changes have handed control to the 'Big Three' nations of England, India and Australia.  The last ICC president was Zaheer Abbas, who was appointed in June 2015 following the resignation of Mustafa Kamal in April 2015. When the post of ICC president was abolished in April 2016, Shashank Manohar, who replaced Srinivasan in October 2015, became the first independent elected chairman of the ICC.

History

 1909–1963 – Imperial Cricket Conference 

On 30 November 1907, Abe Bailey, the President of South African Cricket Association, wrote a letter to the Marylebone Cricket Club's (MCC, England) secretary, Francis Lacey. Bailey suggested the formation of an 'Imperial Cricket Board'. In the letter, he suggested that the board would be responsible for formulation of rules and regulations which will govern the international matches between the three members: Australia, England and South Africa. Bailey, wanted to host a Triangular Test series between the participant countries in South Africa. Australia rejected the offer. However, Bailey did not lose hope. He saw an opportunity of getting the three members together during the Australia's tour of England in 1909. After continued lobbying and efforts, Bailey was successful.

On 15 June 1909, representatives from England, Australia and South Africa met at Lord's and founded the Imperial Cricket Conference. A month later, a second meeting between the three members was held. The rules were agreed amongst the nations, and the first ever Tri-Test series was decided to be held in England in 1912.

In 1926, West Indies, New Zealand and India were elected as Full Members, doubling the number of Test-playing nations to six. After the formation of Pakistan in 1947, it was given Test status in 1952, becoming the seventh Test-playing nation. In May 1961 South Africa left the Commonwealth and therefore lost membership.

 1964–1988 – International Cricket Conference 

In 1964, the ICC agreed upon including the non-Test playing countries. The following year, the ICC changed its name to the International Cricket Conference. The US, Ceylon and Fiji were admitted as Associates, a new class of member.

In 1968, Denmark, Bermuda, Netherlands, and East Africa were admitted as Associates, while South Africa had still not applied to rejoin the ICC.

In 1969, the basic rules of ICC were amended.

At the 1971 meeting, the idea of organizing a World Cup was introduced. At the 1973 meeting, it was decided that a World Cup would be played in 1975 in England. The six Test playing nations and East Africa and Sri Lanka were invited to take part.

New members were added frequently during this period:

In 1974, Israel and Singapore were admitted as Associates.

In 1976, West Africa was admitted as an Associate.

In 1977, Bangladesh was admitted as an Associate.

In 1978, Papua-New Guinea was admitted as an Associate. South Africa applied to rejoin, but their application was rejected.

In 1981, Sri Lanka was promoted to a Full Member, and they played their first Test in 1982.

In 1984, a third class of membership (Affiliate) was introduced. Italy was the first such member, followed by Switzerland in 1985. In 1987, Bahamas and France were admitted, followed by Nepal in 1988.

 1989–present – International Cricket Council 
At the July 1989 meeting, the ICC renamed itself as the International Cricket Council, and the tradition of the MCC President automatically becoming the Chairman of ICC was abolished.

In 1990, UAE joined as an Associate.

In 1991, for the first time in ICC history, the meeting was held away from England, in Melbourne. South Africa was re-elected as a Full Member of the ICC in July, following the end of apartheid.

In 1992, Zimbabwe was admitted as the ninth Full Member. Namibia joined as an Associate member. Austria, Belgium, Brunei and Spain joined as Affiliates.

In 1993, the position of Chief Executive of ICC was created; David Richards of the Australian Cricket Board was the first person appointed to the position. In July, Sir Clyde Walcott, from Barbados, was elected as the first non-British Chairman. The emergence of new technology saw the introduction of a third umpire who was equipped with video playback facilities.

By 1995, TV replays were made available for run-outs and stumpings in Test matches, with the third umpire required to signal out or not out with red and green lights respectively. The following year, the cameras were used to determine if the ball had crossed the boundary, and in 1997 decisions on the cleanness of catches could be referred to the third umpire. This year also saw the introduction of the Duckworth-Lewis method of adjusting targets in rain-affected ODI matches.

In 2000, Bangladesh were admitted as the tenth Full Member of the International Cricket Council.

In 2005, ICC moved to its new headquarters in Dubai.

In 2017, Afghanistan and Ireland were admitted as the eleventh and twelfth Full Members of the International Cricket Council after a unanimous vote at the ICC Full Council meeting at The Oval. Affiliate Membership was also abolished, with all existing Affiliate Members becoming Associate Members.

In 2018, all Women's T20 matches were elevated to Women's Twenty20 International status.

In July 2022, Cambodia, Cote D'Ivoire, and Uzbekistan were granted associate member status by ICC.

 Members 

Full Members – The twelve governing bodies of teams that have full voting rights within the International Cricket Council and play official Test matches.

Associate Members – The 96 governing bodies in countries where cricket is firmly established and organised, but have not been granted Full Membership yet.

Location

From its formation, the ICC had Lord's Cricket Ground as its home, and from 1993 had its offices in the "Clock Tower" building at the nursery end of the ground. The independent ICC was funded initially by commercial exploitation of the rights to the World Cup of One Day International cricket. As not all Member countries had double-tax agreements with the United Kingdom, it was necessary to protect cricket's revenues by creating a company, ICC Development (International) Pvt. Ltd – known as IDI, outside the UK. This was established in January 1994 and was based in Monaco.

For the remainder of the nineties, the administration of IDI was a modest affair. But with the negotiation of a bundle of rights to all ICC events from 2001 to 2008, revenues available to International cricket and the ICC member countries rose substantially. This led to a growth in the number of commercial staff employed by IDI in Monaco. It also had the disadvantage that the council's cricket administrators, who remained at Lord's, were separated from their commercial colleagues in Monaco. The Council decided to seek ways of bringing all of their staff together in one office while protecting their commercial income from tax.

The option of staying at Lord's was investigated and a request was made, through Sport England, to the British Government to allow the ICC to have all its personnel (including those working on commercial matters) in London – but be given special exemption from paying UK corporation tax on its commercial income. The British Government was unwilling to create a precedent and would not agree to this request. As a consequence, the ICC examined other locations and eventually settled on the emirate of Dubai in the United Arab Emirates. ICC is registered in British Virgin Islands. In August 2005, the ICC moved its offices to Dubai, and subsequently closed its offices at Lord's and Monaco. The move to Dubai was made after an 11–1 vote by the ICC's executive board in favour.

While the principal driver of the ICC's move to Dubai was the wish to bring its main employees together in one tax-efficient location, a secondary reason was the wish to move offices closer to the increasingly important new centres of cricketing power in South Asia. Lord's had been a logical venue when the ICC had been administered by the Marylebone Cricket Club (MCC) (a situation that lasted until 1993). But the growing power of India and Pakistan in world cricket had made the continued control of international cricket by a British private members club (the MCC) anachronistic and unsustainable. A direct consequence of the changes and reforms instituted in 1993 was eventually to be the move away from Lord's to a more neutral venue.

Income generation

The ICC generates income from the tournaments it organises, primarily the Cricket World Cup, and it distributes the majority of that income to its members. Sponsorship and television rights of the World Cup brought in over US$1.6 billion between 2007 and 2015, by far the ICC's main source of income. In the nine-month accounting period to 31 December 2007 the ICC had operating income of $12.66 million, mainly from member subscriptions and sponsorship. In contrast, event income was US$285.87 million, including $239 million from the 2007 World Cup. There was also investment income of $6.695 million in the period.

The ICC has no income streams from the bilateral international cricket matches (Test matches, One Day International and Twenty20 Internationals), that account for the great majority of the international playing schedule, as they are owned and run by its members. It has sought to create other new events to augment its World Cup revenues. These include the ICC Champions Trophy and the ICC Super Series played in Australia in 2005. However, these events have not been as successful as the ICC hoped. The Super Series was widely seen as a failure and is not expected to be repeated, and India called for the Champions Trophy to be scrapped in 2006. The Champions Trophy 2004 event was referred to in Wisden 2005 by the editor as a "turkey of a tournament" and a "fiasco"; although the 2006 edition was seen as a greater success due to a new format.

The ICC World Twenty20, first played in 2007, was a success. The ICC's current plan is to have an international tournament every year, with a Twenty20 World Cup played in even number years, the World Cup continuing to be held the year before the Olympic Games, and the ICC Champions Trophy in the remaining year of the cycle. This cycle began in 2010, one year after the 2009 edition.

 Rules and regulation 
The International Cricket Council oversees playing conditions, bowling reviews, and other ICC regulations. The ICC does not have copyright to the Laws of Cricket: only the MCC may change the Laws, though this is usually done in consultation with the game's global governing body. The ICC maintains a set of playing conditions for international cricket which make slight amendments to the Laws. They also have a "Code of Conduct" to which teams and players in international matches are required to adhere. Where breaches of this code occur the ICC can apply sanctions, usually fines. In 2008, the ICC imposed 19 penalties on players.

Umpires and referees
The ICC appoints international umpires and match referees who officiate at all sanctioned Test matches, One-Day Internationals and Twenty20 Internationals. The ICC operates three panels of umpires: the Elite Panel, the International Panel, and the Associates and Affiliates Panel.

As of March 2012, the Elite Panel included twelve umpires. In theory, two umpires from the Elite Panel officiate at every Test match, while one Elite Panel umpire stands in ODI matches together with an umpire from the International Panel. In practice, members of the International Panel stand in occasional Test matches, as this is viewed as a good opportunity to see whether they can cope at the Test level, and whether they should be elevated to the Elite Panel. Members of the Elite Panel are full-time employees of the ICC, although they do still, very occasionally, umpire first-class cricket in their country of residence. The average annual officiating schedule for Elite Umpires is 8–10 Test matches and 10–15 ODIs, a potential on-field workload of 75 days per year, plus travel and preparation time.

The International Panel is made up of officials nominated from each of the ten Test-playing cricket boards. The Panel Members officiate in ODI matches in their home country, and assist the Elite Panel at peak times in the cricket calendar when they can be appointed to overseas ODI and Test matches. International Panel members also undertake overseas umpiring assignments such as the ICC Under 19 Cricket World Cup to improve their knowledge and understanding of overseas conditions, and help them prepare for possible promotion to the Elite Panel. Some of these umpires also officiate in the Cricket World Cup. Each of the Test cricket boards nominates a "third umpire" who can be called upon to review certain on-field decisions through instant television replays. All third umpires are first-class umpires in their own country, and the role is seen as a step onto the International Panel, and then the Elite Panel.

The inaugural ICC Associate and Affiliate International Umpires Panel was formed in June 2006. It superseded the ICC Associate and Affiliate International Umpires Panel, created in 2005, and serves as the pinnacle for umpires from non-Test playing Members, with selection achieved through each of the five ICC Development Program Regional Umpires Panels.

Members of the Associate and Affiliate International Umpires Panel are eligible for appointments to ODIs involving ICC Associate Members, ICC Intercontinental Cup matches and other Associate and Affiliate tournaments. High-performing umpires may also be considered for other ICC events, including the ICC U/19 Cricket World Cup, and could also be invited to be involved in the ICC Champions Trophy and ICC Cricket World Cup.

There is also an Elite Panel of ICC Referees who act as the independent representative of the ICC at all Test and ODI matches. As of January 2009, it had 6 members, all highly experienced former international cricketers. The Referees do not have the power to report players or officials (which has to be done by the umpires), but they are responsible for conducting hearings under the ICC Code of Conduct and imposing penalties as required at matches, ranging from an official reprimand to a lifetime ban from cricket. Decisions can be appealed, but the original decision is upheld in most cases.

The Council failed to achieve consensus among the cricket-playing nations – as of June 2012 – on the universal application of an Umpire's Decision Review System, due to opposition by BCCI. It will continue to be applied subject to mutual agreement of the playing countries. In July 2012, ICC decided to send a delegation to show the ball tracking research done by Dr Ed Rosten, an expert on computer vision and technology, to BCCI to remove the scepticism about the use of DRS technology.

Regional bodies
These regional bodies aim to organise, promote and develop the game of cricket:
 Asian Cricket Council
European Cricket Council
African Cricket Association
 ICC Americas
 ICC East Asia-Pacific

Two further regional bodies were disestablished following the creation of the African Cricket Association:
 East and Central Africa Cricket Council
 West Africa Cricket Council

Rankings, Competitions and awards

 Rankings 
The ICC publishes team rankings for all three formats of the game and updates the same periodically. 
 ICC Men's Test Team Rankings
 ICC Men's ODI Team Rankings
 ICC Men's T20I Team Rankings
 ICC Women's ODI Rankings
 ICC Women's T20I Rankings
The ICC Player Rankings are a widely followed system of rankings for international cricketers based on their recent performances.
 ICC Men's Player Rankings
 ICC Women's Player Rankings

 International Tournaments 

 Tournaments 
The ICC organizes various international Test, One-Day and Twenty20 cricket competitions. 

The ICC in association with Commonwealth Games Federation and International Olympic Committee also conducts Twenty20 Cricket Tournament for Women in Commonwealth Games.

 Qualifiers 
The ICC organizes qualifying tournaments for various international main events for lower tanked teams mostly including the associate members. 

 Awards 
The ICC has instituted the ICC Awards to recognize and honor the best international cricket players of the previous 12 months. The inaugural ICC Awards ceremony was held on 7 September 2004, in London. In 2020, ICC announced a special one-off edition, the ICC Awards of the Decade to honor the best performers and performances in the last 10 years.

Anti-corruption and security
The ICC has also had to deal with drugs and bribery scandals involving top cricketers. Following the corruption scandals by cricketers connected with the legal and illegal bookmaking markets, the ICC set up an Anti-Corruption and Security Unit (ACSU) in 2000 under the retired Commissioner of the London Metropolitan Police, Lord Condon. Among the corruption on which they have reported was that of former South African captain Hansie Cronje who had accepted substantial sums of money from an Indian bookmaker for under-performing or ensuring that certain matches had a pre-determined result. Similarly, the former Indian captain Mohammad Azharuddin and Ajay Jadeja were investigated, found guilty of match-fixing, and banned from playing cricket (for life and for five years, respectively).  The ACSU continues to monitor and investigate any reports of corruption in cricket and protocols have been introduced, which for example prohibit the use of mobile telephones in dressing rooms.

Prior to the 2007 Cricket World Cup ICC chief executive Malcolm Speed warned against any corruption and said that the ICC would be vigilant and intolerant against it.

Following a scandal that occurred during the 2010 Pakistan tour of England, 3 Pakistani players, Mohammad Amir, Mohammad Asif and Salman Butt were found to be guilty of spot-fixing, and were banned for 5 years, 7 years and 10 years respectively. On 3 November 2011, jail terms were handed down of 30 months for Butt, one year for Asif, six months for Amir and two years eight months for Majeed, the sports agent that facilitated the bribes.

In 2019, an investigation by Aljazeera revealed match-fixing in Sri-Lanka, India, England, Australia and other cricket playing nations. The ICC launched an investigation corcerning the report.

Global Cricket Academy

The ICC Global Cricket Academy (GCA) is located at Dubai Sports City in the United Arab Emirates. The GCA's facilities include two ovals, each with 10 turf pitches, outdoor turf and synthetic practice facilities, indoor practice facilities including hawk eye technology and a cricket-specific gymnasium. Rod Marsh has been appointed as the academy's Director of Coaching. The opening, originally planned for 2008, took place in 2010.

ICC Cricket World Program

The International Cricket Council telecasts a weekly program on television called ICC Cricket World. It is produced by Sportsbrand.

It is a weekly 30-minute program providing the latest cricket news, recent cricket action including all Test and One-Day International matches, as well as off-field features and interviews.

Criticism
In 2015, Sam Collins and Jarrod Kimber made the documentary Death of a Gentleman'' on the internal organisation of the ICC, saying that the richer member countries were running the organisation to the detriment of the other members.

See also

 Association of Cricket Officials
 Federation of International Cricketers' Associations
 International structure of cricket
 List of International Cricket Council presidents (Position dissolved since 2014)

References

External links

 

 

International sports organizations
Organisations based in Dubai
Sports organizations established in 1909
Cricket